"This Kiss" is a song recorded by American country music singer Faith Hill from her third studio album Faith. It was written by Beth Nielsen Chapman, Robin Lerner and Annie Roboff, and produced by Hill and Byron Gallimore. It was released on February 23, 1998, as the album's first single.

The song became a crossover hit, reaching number one on the American and Canadian country charts and peaking within the top 10 on both the US Billboard Hot 100 and the Billboard Adult Contemporary chart.  Outside the US, it reached number four in Australia, number 13 in the United Kingdom, and number 24 in Canada, while also charting within the top 30 in Austria and Sweden. "This Kiss" was nominated for two Grammy Awards for Best Female Country Vocal Performance and Best Country Song, losing both to "You're Still the One" by Canadian singer Shania Twain.

Critical reception
Billboard noted the song as "brilliantly produced" and explained further that "this uptempo tune boasts clever lyrics and an infectious melody that are extremely radio-friendly." They complimented Hill's vocal performance as "passionate, jubilant, and thoroughly appealing."

Chart performance
"This Kiss" became Hill's fourth solo number-one, and fifth overall, on the US Billboard Hot Country Singles & Tracks (now Hot Country Songs) chart, and it also peaked atop the Canadian RPM Country Tracks chart. The song was a crossover hit, reaching number seven on the Billboard Hot 100 and number three on the Hot Adult Contemporary Tracks charts, her first entry on the latter chart. In addition, it reached number 24 on the Canadian RPM Top Singles chart and number two on the RPM Adult Contemporary chart.

The single also saw chart success outside North America, becoming Hill's first hit outside the continent. It reached number 13 on the UK Singles Chart, number four on the Australian Singles Chart, and number 18 on the Austrian Singles Chart; it also charted in Germany, the Netherlands, and Sweden.

Music video
The song's music video, directed by Steven Goldmann, features Hill in a colorful fantasy-like sequence. She is featured swinging on a nectarine, jumping from flower to flower, and riding flying bees and butterflies. The video features extensive use of CGI technology, and it won the Video of the Year award at the 1998 Country Music Association awards.

Hill was pregnant with her second daughter Maggie at the time and she was forced to alter her costuming for the video as a result. In her CMT Video Bio, Hill revealed that clothing she tried on and approved for the video just days prior to the shoot, was already too small because of her pregnancy when she arrived on set. A few months after the video's release, Hill (who was further along in her pregnancy by then) performed the song live at the 1998 Academy of Country Music Awards while dancing in a giant flower in the center of the stage, as a tribute.

Track listings

US CD single
 "This Kiss" (radio version) – 3:18
 "Better Days" (album version) – 3:36

UK cassette single
 "This Kiss" (radio version) – 3:18
 "Somebody Stand by Me" – 5:50

German maxi-CD and Australian CD single
 "This Kiss" (radio version) – 3:18
 "Somebody Stand by Me" – 5:50
 "This Kiss" (Mr. Mig mix) – 3:47

Personnel
Personnel are lifted from the Faith liner notes.

 Mike Brignardello – bass guitar
 Larry Byrom – acoustic guitar
 Beth Nielsen Chapman – background vocals
 Glen Duncan – fiddle
 Sonny Garrish – steel guitar
 Jeff King – electric guitar
 Brent Mason – electric guitar
 Steve Nathan – keyboards
 Chris Rodriguez – background vocals
 Lonnie Wilson – drums
 Glenn Worf – bass guitar

Charts

Weekly charts

Year-end charts

Certifications

Release history

Covers and parodies
Italian singer Paola Turci released a cover entitled "Questione di sguardi" on her 2000 album Mi basta il paradiso.

In popular culture
"This Kiss" also became the soundtrack for the 1998 movie Practical Magic. Hill performed the song at the 1999 VH1 Divas concert, and it was included on the show's CD and DVD releases.

References

Songs about kissing
1998 singles
1998 songs
Faith Hill songs
Music videos directed by Steven Goldmann
Song recordings produced by Byron Gallimore
Songs written by Annie Roboff
Songs written by Beth Nielsen Chapman
Songs written by Robin Lerner
Warner Records singles